Jesús Muñoz Calonge (born 1 January 1976) is a Spanish retired footballer who played as a central midfielder, currently a manager.

Playing career
Born in Mota del Cuervo, Province of Cuenca, Castile-La Mancha, Muñoz was an Albacete Balompié youth graduate. On 2 September 1995, aged 19, he made his first-team – and La Liga – debut, starting in a 0–3 away loss against Sporting de Gijón.

Muñoz was first-choice option during the 1995–96 season, which ended in relegation. He continued to feature regularly for Alba in the following campaigns, scoring his first professional goal on 10 November 1996 in a 3–1 Segunda División away victory over Atlético Madrid B.

On 10 July 2001, Muñoz was presented at Atlético Madrid, recently relegated to the second division. He only made 13 competitive appearances during his spell, achieving top-flight promotion as champions.

In 2002, Muñoz signed for Deportivo de La Coruña and was immediately loaned to Real Zaragoza of the second tier. On 31 August 2004, he moved to fellow league team Terrassa FC also in a temporary deal.

Returning to Dépor in 2005, Muñoz only featured in one league match (17 minutes in a 2–1 away defeat of CA Osasuna on 26 February 2006) before leaving the club. He subsequently represented amateurs RSD Alcalá and CP Villarrobledo, retiring with the latter at the age of 32.

Coaching career
In 2012, Muñoz was appointed assistant of Paco Jémez at Rayo Vallecano. He followed Jémez to Granada CF, but after the manager left for Cruz Azul they ended their partnership.

On 7 December 2017, Muñoz was announced as Chen Jingang's assistant at Changchun Yatai F.C. of the Chinese Super League. The following 5 July, he joined Fran Fernández's staff at UD Almería in the same capacity.

Muñoz was given his first head coach job on 22 September 2019, at Segunda División B's Hércules CF. He was dismissed on 9 December, having taken 12 points from 11 games and with the side in the relegation zone.

Managerial statistics

Honours

Player
Atlético Madrid
Segunda División: 2001–02

References

External links

1976 births
Living people
Sportspeople from the Province of Cuenca
Spanish footballers
Footballers from Castilla–La Mancha
Association football midfielders
La Liga players
Segunda División players
Tercera División players
Albacete Balompié players
Atlético Madrid footballers
Deportivo de La Coruña players
Real Zaragoza players
Terrassa FC footballers
RSD Alcalá players
Spanish football managers
Segunda División B managers
Hércules CF managers
Spanish expatriate sportspeople in China